Dirk Hafemeister (17 April 1958 – 31 August 2017) was a German equestrian and Olympic champion. He won a gold medal in show jumping with the West German team at the 1988 Summer Olympics in Seoul.

References

1958 births
2017 deaths
Sportspeople from Berlin
German male equestrians
Olympic equestrians of West Germany
Olympic gold medalists for West Germany
Equestrians at the 1988 Summer Olympics
Olympic medalists in equestrian
Medalists at the 1988 Summer Olympics